Sedamsville is a neighborhood in Cincinnati, Ohio. The population was 1,256 at the 2020 census.

History
Sedamsville was established in 1795 by Colonel Cornelius Sedam, a veteran of the Revolutionary War, who moved to the area to assist in the building of Fort Washington. The neighborhood was also home to one of the first Fleischmann's Yeast factories in the US and was founded by Louis Fleischmann, his brother Maximilian, and James Gaff. The Industrial Revolution changed the landscape bringing commerce and large factories to the area along with a new influx of residents. Unfortunately the Great Depression saw many of those businesses close their doors, and then the disastrous flood of 1937 made it impossible for many to rebuild. Many more buildings were destroyed with the widening of River Road in the 1940s which nearly wiped out the business district completely.

With the closing of Our Lady of Perpetual Help Church, the neighborhood began to deteriorate. With help from the Cincinnati Preservation Association, many historic buildings have been saved from demolition. Nearly the whole town is now listed on the National Register of Historical Places.

Demographics

Source - City of Cincinnati Statistical Database
Note before 2010 Sedamsville had parts of the Riverside neighborhood included in its census tract.

National Historic Register of Places
The Sedamsville Rectory is listed on the National Historic registry and the Travel Channel’s list of most haunted places in America.  It has been featured on several paranormal TV shows including Ghost Adventures, Haunted Collector and My Ghost Story.

Notable person
 Pete Rose, Major League Baseball player

References

Neighborhoods in Cincinnati